ŠK Vrakuňa is a Slovak football team, based in the town of Vrakuňa, near Bratislava. The club was founded in 1939. Club colors are blue and white. ŠK Vrakuňa home stadium is Štadión Šk Vrakuňa Bratislava with a capacity of 1,500 spectators.

Current squad

Staff

Current technical staff

Historical names
 TJ Dunaj Vrakuňa (?)
 TJ Doprastav Vrakuňa (1980–1993)
 ŠK Vrakuňa Bratislava (1993–present)

External links 

  

Football clubs in Slovakia
Football clubs in Bratislava
Association football clubs established in 1939
1939 establishments in Slovakia